Bloodgood is a surname. Notable people with the surname include:

 Frans Jansen Bloetgoet, Dutch emigrant to Flushing, NY and progenitor of the American Bloodgood family
 Al Bloodgood, American football player for the Nebraska Cornhuskers and Green Bay Packers
 Clara Bloodgood, stage actress
 Claude Bloodgood, chess player
 Lt. Col. Edward Bloodgood of the Union Army who fought at the Battle of Brentwood
 Joseph Wheeler Bloodgood (1926-1960), American judge and politician
 Katherine Bloodgood, American contralto singer and vaudeville performer
 Moon Bloodgood, actress and model
 Headless Headmistress Bloodgood, daughter of the Headless Horseman from Monster High